Que El Ritmo No Pare is the fourth studio album by the Mexican singer Patricia Manterola.

Singles
"Que El Ritmo No Pare" was the first single from the album. four versions of the songs were recorded: "Que El Fútbol No Pare", for the 2002 FIFA World Cup, "Que Mexico No Pare", used as a fight song for the Mexico national team also as one of the official anthem of the XFL on TUDN, and an English-language version of the song "The Rhythm", used as a theme song for the 2001 Formula One season and is used in the 2014 video game NASCAR '14

Track listing

The Rhythm

References

External links
Que El Ritmo No Pare by Patricia Manterola, Amazon.com.

2002 albums
Patricia Manterola albums
Albums produced by Fernando Garibay